(born August 6, 1990 in Tokyo) is a Japanese actress and singer.

Biography 
Aso began her career playing the role of Chisame in the Negima drama and as a member of the band pRythme. Later, she has appeared in a number of TV dramas and began a solo music career. Her single "Perfect Area Complete" was chosen as the opening song for the Baka to Test to Shōkanjū anime. She currently presents the second season of Japan In Motion, a show broadcast on the French TV network Nolife.

In 2010 she was a music guest for the French Japan Expo 2010.

In 2011, she made an appearance in the PV for Hyadain's Kakakata Kataomoi-C where she played the role of Hyadain's female counterpart Hyadaruko

In 2012 she was a guest for Hyper Japan in London, and performed in the United States for the first time at Otakon Music Festival in Baltimore with Faylan and JAM Project.

Filmography

Dramas 
 Black Sun (Hiromi)
 Negima! Magister Negi Magi (Chisame Hasegawa)
 Saito (gyaru)
 The Tears Kiss (Meg)
 Cat Street (Misaki)
 Kamen Rider W (Himeka Yukimura)

Stage play 
 Persona 4 The Ultimate in Mayonaka Arena Stageplay (Rise Kujikawa)

Discography

Singles 
 "Brand-New World" released on May 27, 2009, Shin Mazinger Shōgeki! Z-Hen ending theme
 "Programming For Non-Fiction" released on July 23, 2009, Yoku Wakaru Gendai Mahō opening theme, peak rank No. 83 at Oricon singles charts
 "Perfect Area Complete!" released on January 27, 2010, Baka to Test to Shōkanjū opening theme, peak rank No. 18 at Oricon singles charts
 "Everyday Sunshine Line!" released on May 12, 2010, Ichiban Ushiro no Daimaō ending theme, peak rank No. 72 at Oricon singles charts
 "More-more Lovers!!" released on November 10, 2010, MM! ending theme
  released on February 9, 2011, Cardfight!! Vanguard ending theme
  released March 9, 2011,  Baka to Test to Shōkanjū Matsuri opening theme
  released July 20, 2011, Baka to Test to Shōkanjū 2! ending theme
 "Lovely Girls Anthem" released on February 8, 2012, Tantei Opera Milky Holmes 2 ending theme
 "Fighting Growing Diary" released on July 25, 2012, Cardfight!! Vanguard Asia Circuit Hen ending theme
 "Parade!" released on October 24, 2012, Ragnarok Online RWC2012 cheer song
 "Never Ending Voyage" released on July 24, 2013.
 "MoonRise Romance" released on November 27, 2013, Walkure Romanze ending theme

Albums 
 Movement of Magic released on August 4, 2010
 Precious Tone released on October 26, 2011
 My Starlit Point released on March 5, 2014

References

External links 

 麻生夏子 オフィシャルブログ「あっ、そーです。私が麻生夏子です。」  
  
  
 
 Natsuko Aso on Last.fm

1990 births
Anime musicians
Living people
21st-century Japanese actresses
Singers from Tokyo
Lantis (company) artists
Stardust Promotion artists
21st-century Japanese singers
21st-century Japanese women singers